Florence is an unincorporated community in St. Mary Parish, Louisiana, United States.

References

Unincorporated communities in St. Mary Parish, Louisiana
Unincorporated communities in Louisiana